Colby College is a private liberal arts college in Waterville, Maine. It was founded in 1813 as the Maine Literary and Theological Institution, then renamed Waterville College after the city where it resides. The donations of Christian philanthropist Gardner Colby saw the institution renamed again to Colby University before settling on its current title, reflecting its liberal arts college curriculum. Approximately 2,000 students from more than 60 countries are enrolled annually.  The college offers 54 major fields of study and 30 minors.

Located in central Maine, the 714-acre Neo-Georgian campus sits atop Mayflower Hill and overlooks downtown Waterville and the Kennebec River Valley. Along with fellow Maine institutions Bates College and Bowdoin College, Colby competes in the New England Small College Athletic Conference (NESCAC) and the Colby-Bates-Bowdoin Consortium. In addition to Bates and Bowdoin, Colby is among the most selective liberal arts colleges in the country, and is considered a Little Ivy.

History

19th century 
On February 27, 1813, the Commonwealth of Massachusetts, led by Baptists, adopted a petition to establish the Maine Literary and Theological Institution. It was moved to Waterville, Maine, and used 179 acres of land donated by citizens. In 1818, trustees assigned the institution to Rev. Jeremiah Chaplin and classes began in a vacant Waterville home. After Maine separated from Massachusetts in 1820, the first Maine legislature affirmed the Massachusetts charter for the institution, but made significant changes. Students could no longer be denied admission based on religion, the institution was prohibited from applying a religious test when selecting board members, and the trustees now had the authority to grant degrees. The Maine Literary and Theological Institution was renamed Waterville College on February 5, 1821, and four years later, the theological department was discontinued.  In 1828 the trustees decided to turn the somewhat informal preparatory department of the college into a separate school named Waterville Academy (most recently called the Coburn Classical Institute).

In 1833, Rev. Rufus Babcock became Colby's second president, and students formed the nation's first college-based anti-slavery society.  In 1845, the college's first Greek Society was formed, a chapter of Delta Kappa Epsilon, which was followed by chapters of Zeta Psi in 1850 and Delta Upsilon in 1852.

During the Civil War, many young men were called away from school to join the fight; from Waterville College, Richard C. Shannon, Henry C. Merriam, and Benjamin Butler. Twenty-seven Waterville College students perished in the war, and more than 100 men from the town.  In the years following the war, as was the case at many American colleges, Waterville College was left with few students remaining to pay the bills and a depleted endowment. The college was on the verge of closing.

On August 9, 1865, prominent Baptist philanthropist Gardner Colby attended Waterville College's commencement dinner, and unbeknownst to anyone in attendance except college president James Tift Champlin, announced a matching $50,000 donation to the college; two years later the college was named after him. Trustees of the college voted to construct a library and chapel to honor the Colby men who died in the war, called the Memorial Hall; it was dedicated at the commencement of 1869. The college remained isolated from neighboring Bates College, and Bowdoin College due to its location in Waterville, coupled with socio-economic and political differences. At the 1871 commencement, a Martin Milmore sculpture based on the Lion of Lucerne was added as the centerpiece of the building. In the fall of 1871, Colby University was the first all-male college in New England to accept female students.  The national Sigma Kappa sorority was founded at Colby in 1874 by the college's first five female students.  However the college resegregated them in 1890. One of the buildings is named after the first woman to attend, Mary Caffrey Low, who was the valedictorian of the Class of 1875. In 1874, based on the success of its partnership with the Coburn Classical Institute, Colby created relationships with Hebron Academy and Houlton Academy (most recently known as Ricker College).  In 1893, the Higgins Classical Institute was also deeded to Colby - the last preparatory school that the university would acquire.  Students published the first issue of The Colby Echo in 1877. On January 25, 1899, Colby president Nathaniel Butler Jr. '73, renamed the "university" Colby College.

In 1920, Colby celebrated its centennial, marking not the date of the original charter (1813), but the date of its charter from the new State of Maine in 1820.

20th century 
Franklin W. Johnson was appointed president of the college in June 1929. That same year saw the public release of the Maine Higher Education Survey Report, which gave Colby's campus a less than desirable review.  Criticisms included a cramped location on just 28 acres located between the Kennebec River and the Maine Central Railroad Company tracks through Waterville, an aging physical plant, proximity to the unpleasant odors of a pulp mill, and the soot of the railroad.  Using the report as justification, President Johnson presented a proposal to the Trustees on June 14, 1929, to move the college to a more adequate location .  The campaign to raise funds for the move was immediately complicated by the Wall Street Crash of 1929 and the Great Depression, and competing offers for the college's contemplated location emerged.  Most notably, William H. Gannett offered a site in Augusta - a financially attractive option for the college, but a troublesome prospect for the town of Waterville.  Ultimately, a joint effort between Waterville citizens and the college raised more than $100,000 to purchase  near the outskirts of the city on Mayflower Hill, and the deed was presented to the college on April 12, 1931.

Mayflower Hill
Colby employs 216 instructional faculty members, approximately 90% of whom hold a doctorate or other terminal degree.
In 1937, according to master plans drawn up by Jens Fredrick Larson, construction broke ground on Lorimer Chapel, the first building on the new Mayflower Hill campus. In 1956, the Maine State Highway Commission diverted the proposed path of Interstate 95 to swing clear of the new campus to the west, and in 1961, Parade magazine called the 24-mile section of I-95 from Augusta to Waterville "America's finest example of a 'driver's road' " for scenery, speed, and safety. The college began competing athletically with Bowdoin and Bates in the 1940s, and officially joined the two colleges in the Colby-Bates-Bowdoin Consortium in 1965, after the University of Maine increased enrollment and moved to another athletic conference. The consortium became an athletic rivalry and academic exchange program.

21st century 
William D. Adams was the President of Colby from 2000 to 2014.  Major accomplishments included conducting the largest capital campaign in the history of Maine, which raised $376 million; a new strategic plan for the college; accepting a major gift for the Colby College Museum of Art- the Lunder Collection of American Art - and the construction of a new wing for the museum to house it in 2013; expansion onto the "Colby Green" with the construction of the Diamond Building in 2007 and the Davis Science Building in 2014.
In 2014, a documentary was created depicting a wide range of student experiences, including academic climate, social gatherings, athletics, and graduate outlooks, called Colby Life. On July 1, 2014, David A. Greene took office as the new president of the college.

Academics

Students choose from courses in 54 major fields and have flexibility in designing independent study programs, electing special majors, and participating in internships and study-abroad programs. Colby emphasizes project-based learning.  Colby's most popular majors, by 2021 graduates, were:
Econometrics and Quantitative Economics (62)
Political Science and Government (62)
Computer Science (34)
Psychology (32)
Environmental Science (30)
Biology/Biological Sciences (29)
Neuroscience (29)
Volunteer programs and service learning take many students into the surrounding community. Colby employs 216 instructional faculty members, approximately 90% whom hold a doctorate or other terminal degree.

The academic year follows a 4–1–4 with two four-course semesters plus a Winter Term session in January. The Winter Term, often called "Jan-plan", allows students to enroll in one intensive course, pursue independent research, or complete an off-campus internship.

More than two-thirds of Colby's students spend time studying off-campus before they graduate.  The college recognizes credits earned at over 200 off-campus programs in more than 60 countries.  Additionally, studies at four programs locations are recognized for inclusion in students calculated grade-point averages: The International Center for French Studies at the University of Burgundy in Dijon, France; the St. Petersburg Classical Gymnasium in Saint Petersburg, Russia; The University of Salamanca in Salamanca, Spain; and the Bigelow Laboratory for Ocean Sciences in Boothbay Harbor, Maine.

Colby also participates in engineering dual-degree programs with the Columbia School of Engineering and Applied Science at Columbia University, and the Thayer School of Engineering at Dartmouth College. The programs vary in length and requirements. The Dartmouth College program, which is on a 2–1–1–1 schedule, is the more popular one. 

For the class of 2024, Colby College admitted 9% of applicants, accepting 1,307 out of 13,922 applicants. This represents a 13.5 percentage point decrease from the acceptance rate for the Class of 2019, which was 22.5%, due in part to the college's decision to waive certain admissions requirements, such as the supplemental essay, and by increasing financial aid commitments.

Rankings

The 2020 annual ranking of U.S. News & World Report rates it tied for the 11th best liberal arts college overall in the U.S., 16th for "Best Value", tied at 18th for "Most Innovative" and tied at 48th for "Best Undergraduate Teaching" among liberal arts colleges. Washington Monthly ranked the college 37th in 2019 among 214 liberal arts colleges in the U.S. based on its contribution to the public good, as measured by social mobility, research, and promoting public service. Forbes in 2019 rated Colby 75th overall in its America's Top Colleges ranking of 650 military academies, national universities, and liberal arts colleges, and 32nd among liberal arts colleges.  Kiplinger's Personal Finance places Colby at 46th in its 2019 ranking of 149 best value liberal arts colleges in the United States. Colby College is accredited by the New England Commission of Higher Education.

In 2016, Niche gave the college an "A+" for academics, administration, food, campus quality and diversity, a "B" for campus housing, health & safety, and athletics, and a "C+" for local city, and off-campus housing. In Niche's official rankings, the college placed 16th for liberal arts and 46th overall. Colby was ranked 29th in the country by Parchment. Colby was also named one of "25 New Ivies" by Newsweek, named to the list of the top ten environmental programs by the 2010 Fiske Guide, and ranked 13th by the 2011 Sierra Club rankings of "America's coolest schools".

Campus

Colby's 714-acre campus is situated on Mayflower Hill overlooking Waterville, Maine, located along the Kennebec River Valley in Central Maine. Colby's campus buildings vary in age from the original Mayflower Hill construction in the 1930s to its newest building, Davis, completed in 2014. Most of Colby's buildings are designed in the Georgian Revival style of the original Mayflower Hill construction. The Goldfarb Center for Public Affairs and Civic Engagement organizes Colby's engagement in the local community.  The Goldfarb Center has assumed responsibility for organizing and awarding the Elijah Parish Lovejoy Award annually, established in 1952, the Morton A. Brody Distinguished Judicial Service Award, the William R. and Linda K. Cotter Debate Series, the Senator George J. Mitchell Distinguished International Lecture Series, and Colby's Visiting Fellows Program.  The center also organizes Colby's civic engagement programs, the Colby Volunteer Center and Colby Cares about Kids.  The college earned a top-25 listing on the Peace Corps' "ranking of colleges that produce the most volunteers."

Colby is a residential college and almost all students live on campus. The dormitories vary in design and age; some are from the original Mayflower Hill construction, with the newest addition being the Alfond Senior Apartments. Room arrangements range from singles to quads and apartment suites.

Cotter Union is the center of student life and programming, and houses the Pulver Pavilion, Pugh Center for Multicultural Affairs, Page Commons auditorium, and the Student Post Office.  Mary Low contains the Colby Outing Club and the Mary Low Coffee House for student performances, Roberts Union houses student offices for the Colby Echo and the radio station WMHB.

All meals and catered events on campus are served by Colby Dining Services, operated by Sodexo until July 2016, which makes a concentrated effort to purchase foods from suppliers and producers within the state of Maine, like Oakhurst Dairy and others.  Dining-hall options include four establishments on Campus, plus the Marchese Blue Light Pub.

Bon Appétit Management Company currently operates Colby Dining Services

Libraries

Colby's three libraries—Miller Library, the Bixler Art and Music Library, and the Olin Science Library—have a collection of more than 900,000 books, journals, microfilms, music scores, sound recordings, videos/DVDs, and manuscripts. They provide access to more than 100 electronic databases and more than 47,500 electronic journals. Computer labs, wireless networks, laptops, study areas, and a listening center are available for student use.

Colby College Museum of Art

The college's Museum of Art was founded in 1959 with the building of the Mayflower Hill Campus.  Admission is free to the museum, which serves both as a teaching resource for Colby College and as an active cultural institution for the residents of Maine and visitors to the state.  It is notable for an entire wing dedicated to works by American painter Alex Katz, a particularly strong collection of American art, and its major outdoor sculptures by Richard Serra and Sol LeWitt. The museum is part of the Bixler Art and Music Center, a building named in honor of President J. Seelye Bixler (1942–1960) in recognition of his visionary support for the arts at Colby.  The most recent addition to the museum was the Alfond-Lunder wing, opened in 2013 to display the recently donated Lunder Collection of American Art. The gallery space in the museum now exceeds 38,000 square feet, surpassing the Portland Museum of Art and making it the largest art museum in Maine.

Sustainability
In the fall of 2009, Colby launched Green Colby to highlight Colby's environmental policies (carbon footprint, conservation, student involvement etc.).  The school has signed a number of official agreements to reduce its environmental impact, including the Maine Governor's Carbon Challenge and the American College and University President's Climate Commitment (ACUPCC).  As of April 2013, Colby became the fourth institution of higher education to achieve campus carbon neutrality.

All of the school's electricity comes from renewable sources—hydro and biomass—with 10 percent of campus electricity provided by an on-campus cogeneration turbine.  The college has stated that all new buildings will comply with a minimum LEED silver standard, and renovated buildings will also include green features. The dining halls make an effort to purchase local and organic foods, and the elimination of trays has saved 79,000 gallons of water and 50 tons of food waste annually. Colby also has a composting program which processes more than 100 tons of food and yard waste annually. On the College Sustainability Report Card 2009 Colby earned a B; Colby's grade was brought down by its lack of endowment transparency and shareholder engagement.

Student life

Colby's 1,800-plus students, evenly divided between men and women, come from every state and more than 60 countries. Colby students are listed as 67.2% white, 10.2% unknown race, 24% of its students being ALANA (Asian, Latino, African American, etc.) and 7% being international.

Colby's was one of the five original schools to partner with the Shelby Davis Scholarship program for graduates from the United World Colleges, dramatically increasing the international student population.  Colby also participates in the Posse Foundation for multicultural scholars.

The college hosts myriad student-run organizations, ranging from student-run government to a cappella groups and more. The Student Government Association (SGA) advises and interacts with the college administration on issues ranging from policies and procedures to class presidents and dorm heads; it is also responsible for allocating funding to other student-run organizations.  The Student Programming Board is the student organization which plans speaking events, concerts, dances and other gatherings.

Other student organizations range from a radio station and a newspaper to the Rugby team, Woodsman team, the Colby Outing Club, and more.

Athletics

The Colby Mules compete in National Collegiate Athletic Association (NCAA) Division III, the New England Small College Athletic Conference (NESCAC), and the Colby-Bates-Bowdoin Consortium.  The three schools compete vigorously in athletics, most notably in football and the Chase Regatta.
There are 16 varsity teams for women, 15 for men, and one co-ed team.  The official school colors are blue and gray.  Approximately 1/3 of the student population participates in one or more of 32 intercollegiate varsity sports.  Colby also offers club sports and an intramural sports program called I-Play.  As of 2013, five graduates have qualified for the Olympic Games. Colby holds nine national titles in the NESCAC.

The Harold Alfond Athletic Center is the center of athletic life at Colby, and home to the Colby Mules. It contains the Wadsworth Gymnasium, with a capacity of 2,600 people, the Alfond Rink with 1,750 seats, the Colby swimming pool, The Dunaway Squash Courts, the Boulos Family Fitness Center, and a field house with a four-lane, 220-yard track, and athletic offices.

Surrounding the Harold Alfond Athletic Center are the Harold Alfond Stadium and track, two illuminated synthetic turf fields, the Alfond-Wales Tennis Courts, three full-size grass playing fields, a baseball diamond, a softball diamond, and the Perkins Arboretum with cross-country running trails.

In addition to the on-campus facilities, the Mules also utilize numerous off-campus facilities. The Colby-Hume Center for Colby's crew and sailing teams is located on Messalonskee Lake. Sugarloaf Ski Resort is home to the Alpine Ski Team, and is used extensively by recreational skiers from Colby because of its proximity to campus, about 50 miles away. The Waterville Country Club is home to Colby's golf program.

Controversies 
In 1977, Colby and TIAA–CREF successfully defended a lawsuit brought by the Equal Employment Opportunity Commission, alleging sex discrimination in payment of retirement benefits.  Of the case, President Strider commented that "Colby is prepared, as we have always tried to do, to comply with the law, but it would be helpful to know what the law is."

In 1984, following an investigation of campus life commissioned by the Board of Trustees, a decision was made to withdraw recognition from Colby's Greek system as it was seen to be "exclusionary by nature".

Notable alumni

Alumni, now numbering more than 25,000, are represented in all 50 states and 75 foreign countries. Alumni remain engaged with the college through alumni programs, affinity groups, and a directory and related services online, all offered by the Office of Alumni Relations.

Colby alumni include Governors Lot M. Morrill (ex-1869), Harris M. Plaisted (1881–1883), Nelson Dingley, Jr. (1874–1876), Llewellyn Powers (1901–1908), Benjamin Butler (1883–1884), Marcellus Stearns (1874–1877), and George A. Ramsdell (1897–1899).

Other notable alumni include: Harvard Professor and White House Consultant Gregory Ciottone (1987),  former Barclays Chief Executive Officer Robert Diamond (1973), U.S. Senator from Florida (1969–1974) Edward Gurney (1935), abolitionist Elijah P. Lovejoy (1826),  Assistant Secretary for Public Affairs and U.S. State Department Spokesman Sean McCormack (1986), mathematician and founding member of the Institute for Advanced Study Marston Morse (1914), President and CEO of the Federal Reserve Bank of Boston Eric S. Rosengren (1979), former White House Chief of Staff Pete Rouse (1968), author Doris Kearns Goodwin (1964), pathologist and author Stephen Sternberg (1941), and academic and author of the Spenser detective novels Robert B. Parker (1954), Pulitzer-Prize winning author Gregory White Smith (1973), political analyst Amy Walter (1991), Political Director of ABC News, former house editor for the Cook Political Report, Editor in Chief of The Hotline,  and NFL General Manager Eric DeCosta of the Baltimore Ravens (1993).

Presidents of Colby

The Administration is made up of the president, officers, a board of trustees with faculty and student representation, and a board of overseers.  Since the founding of the college in 1813, 20 presidents have served, with Colby alumni having served as four Presidents of the college: Albion Woodbury Small, class of 1876, President from 1889 to 1892; Nathaniel Butler Jr., class of 1873, President from 1896 to 1901; Arthur J. Roberts, class of 1890, President from 1908 to 1927; and Franklin W. Johnson, class of 1891, President from 1929 to 1942.  David Greene currently serves in the role since 2014.

Insignia and other representations

Seal and motto
"Lux Mentis Scientia", meaning "knowledge is the light of the mind", is the college's motto.  
  
The college was originally authorized to have a seal by its founding charter, granted by the Massachusetts General Court in 1813, in section 4. Presently, the seal figures prominently on college diplomas as well as other official communications and merchandise.

History and Revisions
  
The history of the seal tracks both the history of the school, which began under the name Maine Literary and Theological Institution, and sigillography generally. The earliest known seal came while the school was called Colby University.  It featured a sun in splendour with eight straight rays above the school's Latin motto.  Surrounding the center are the words "Sigillum Universitatis Colbianae," meaning "the seal of Colby College", and two crossed olive branch with five leaves each.  In 1899 the "university" was renamed Colby College, and a new seal was created with minor artistic changes to reflect the school's new name.

  
  
In 1936, President Franklin W. Johnson commissioned William Addison Dwiggins to design a seal to replace the one then existing, specifying only that it (1) used the same motto as the first and (2) retain the sun as the central theme.  The cost of the design was $50.  The face on the sun was removed and the lettering and its positioning was changed.

In 2002, the college contracted with design firm Corey McPherson Nash for updates to its entire visual identity system, including the seal.  The current seal is set in Perpetua typeface around a sunburst.  The seal is registered with the United States Patent and Trademark Office as a trademark under registration number 2773337. A special seal was developed for the college's bicentennial celebration in 2013.

Alma mater
Colby's alma mater is "Hail, Colby, Hail". The lyrics to the song were written by Karl R. Kennison from the class of 1906. It is sung to the tune of "O Canada".  In 1979, the second line was changed from "thy sons from far and near" to "thy people far and near."

References

Further reading

}

External links

 
 Colby Athletics website

 
1813 establishments in Maine
Education in Waterville, Maine
Educational institutions established in 1813
Liberal arts colleges in Maine
Private universities and colleges in Maine
Universities and colleges in Kennebec County, Maine